Satz may refer to:

 Satz, a formal section in music analysis
 Satz (SAT solver), a well known SAT instance solver

People

 Alexander Satz (1941–2007), Russian pianist and educator
 Ludwig Satz (1891–1944), Yiddish theatre performer
 Michael Satz (20th century), American politician
 Wayne Thomas Satz (1945–1992), American journalist

See also

 Ursatz
 Proposition (mathematics) (English translation of German word Satz)